Stefania Jabłońska (born Szela Ginzburg; 7 September 1920 – 8 May 2017) was a Polish physician and professor specializing in dermatology. She worked at the Medical University of Warsaw.

In 1972, she theorized the association of human papilloma viruses with skin cancer in epidermodysplasia verruciformis.

In 1978, Jabłońska and Gerard Orth at the Pasteur Institute discovered HPV-5 in skin cancer. Jabłońska was awarded the 1985 Robert Koch Prize.

She is a recipient of the National Order of Merit and the Commander's Cross of the Order of Polonia Restituta.

Biography
She was born as Szela Ginzburg in 1920 in Mogilev, present-day Belarus, and at the age of six moved to Warsaw. Later known as Stefania Jabłońska, she earned her high school diploma in 1937 in Warsaw, where she began to study medicine in the same year at the Medical University of Warsaw. In 1938 she moved to the University of Lviv and a year later to Kyrgyz Technical University, where she graduated in 1942 with a medical degree. She then served two years in the military.

She specialized in dermatology, worked for a year at the Soviet Science Academy in the Department of Pathology, and in 1946 in the Department of Dermatology of the Medical University of Warsaw. With a grant from the World Health Organization in 1949, she spent a year at the University of Pennsylvania.

Jabłońska earned a Doctor of Science in 1950. In 1951 she qualified as a professor. Jabłońska was appointed to head dermatology at the Medical University of Warsaw in 1954. She became professor emeritus in 1990. She died on 8 May 2017, age 96.

Awards and honors

A partial list of Jabłońska's honors and awards.

State decorations

Orders and awards

Membership

Honorary

Non-dermatological

Dermatological

References

1920 births
2017 deaths
Polish dermatologists
20th-century Polish Jews
Physicians from Warsaw
Cancer researchers
Papillomavirus
Place of death missing
Kyrgyz Technical University alumni
Medical University of Warsaw alumni
University of Lviv alumni